The Low Lows are an American avant-garde Americana/Alternative country band currently consisting of Mangham Parker, Brockett Hamilton, Matt Verta-Ray and Zachary Larkins

History
The Low Lows was formed in Athens, Georgia in 2005, originally consisting of lead vocalist and guitarist Mangham Parker (aka Parker Noon), organist Daniel Rickard, and drummer Jeremy Wheatley, all of whom are former members of the band Parker and Lily.  Parker has been the only constant in the band, as Rickard and Wheatley left the band in 2008 and there have been several other musicians who have joined the band and left since the band was formed.

The current lineup resides in Austin, Texas, USA.  With the move to Austin, their live performances found them creating lavish walls of sound, playing with as many as fourteen musicians at once.  They have toured extensively in the U.S. and Europe, receiving much critical acclaim and playing for high-profile venues, including Austin City Limits.

In 2006, they released their debut album, Fire On the Bright Sky, followed by their single Elizabeth Pier (2007) and in 2008, they released their second full-length album Shining Violence.  After three years of touring, in early February 2011, it was reported that in the upcoming months, they would be releasing a new full-length album titled Gaudy Frame, however the album was postponed.  In March, 2013, it was reported that two new albums would be released in succession in 2013.  These were identified as the above-mentioned Gaudy Frame and a second album titled Light All The Lights.

Genre
The Low Lows songs are often considered haunting, surreal and melancholic.  Their choruses often grow to become appropriately "noise drenched" and swell with a dissonance, toying with chaos, yet somehow remaining elegant, often resolving with an underlying sense of familiarity.

Their style is hard to place into any combination of genres (let alone one), but is consistently referred to as experimental, lo-fi alternative rock.  Their choice of instruments (see link below: members/instruments) is also likely the reason they are also often considered alt-country or progressive country with old gospel influences. For reasons not yet explained by the band, their MySpace page defines their style as simply thrash.  They have been compared to bands such as South San Gabriel, Castanets, My Morning Jacket, Phosphorescent, and Band of Horses.

Band members

Current members
 Mangham Parker (aka Parker Noon) - lead vocals, vox, guitar (2005–present)
 Matt Verta-Ray (2005–present)
 Brockett Hamilton - lap steel guitar, harmonica (2009–Present)
 Zachary Larkins (2012–Present)

References

Past/Touring/Contributing members

 Daniel Rickard - acoustic guitar, bass organ, harmonica, vocals (2005–2008)
 Jeremy Wheatley - drums (on the first 5 tours and 2 records) (2005–2008)
 Lily Wolfe (on the first 3 tours and 2 records) - organs etc. (2005–2008)
 Christina Campanella (2005-2008)
 Abram Shook - organ (Euro Tour '08) (2008-2008)
 Patrick Ferguson - drums (2008-2008)
 Bryan Crowell - guitar, farfisa, rhodes bass (2009-2012)
 Nick Warrenchuck - trombone drums (2009-2011)
 Greg McCue - drums (2009-2011)
 Heidi Johnson - trombone, acetone organ, Wurlitzer (2009-2010)
 Kullen Fuchs - trumpet and vibraphone (2009-2010)
 Mike St.Claire - trombone and trumpet (2009-2011)
 Matt Bricker - trumpet, acetone organ (2009-2010)
 Brandon Newton (2012-2012)
 Mikey Dwyer - bass (Euro Tour '08)
 Eva Hanna - bass
 Page Campbell - guitar
 Matt Stossel - steel guitar
 John Neff- steel guitar
 Brent Jones - drums
 Josiah McG - drums
 Amanda Kapousouz - strings
 Perrish and Bassam Mussad - trumpets
 Kevin and David Nelson - trombones
 Jared Theis - clarinet
 Darian Mola Momanee - trumpet and tambourine
 Paul Simpson - singing saw
 Nick Warrenchuk - trombone

References

Discography

Full-length albums
Fire On the Bright Sky - 2006 (Warm)
Shining Violence - 2008 (Monotreme)

Singles
Elizabeth Pier - 2007 (Monotreme)

References

External links 
 
 Last.fm: The Low Lows
 [  Allmusic: The Low Lows]
 Warm Records: The Low Lows
 Monotreme Records: The Low Lows
 Misra Records: The Low Lows
 Last.fm: Lily and Parker

Indie rock musical groups from Georgia (U.S. state)
Indie rock musical groups from Texas
Musical groups from Athens, Georgia
Musical groups from Austin, Texas
Musical groups established in 2005
2005 establishments in Georgia (U.S. state)
Sadcore and slowcore groups
Misra Records artists
Warm Electronic Recordings artists